Wolfgang Maier (born 13 January 1949) is a German psychiatrist and psychotherapist.

Academic and professional career 
Wolfgang Maier first studied mathematics and economics at the Ludwig Maximilian University of Munich, graduating with diplomas in 1973. That same year he started studying medicine, also at the University of Munich. In 1980 he received his doctorate in medicine. In 1981 he started working at the Psychiatric University Clinic Mainz, first as a clinical scientist and doctor, before being promoted to senior physician and later to chief senior physician. In 1990 he qualified as a professor for the medical field of psychiatry. Concurrently, he went to the USA for several scientific work stays (esp. Cornell Medical School in New York City and Washington University School of Medicine in St. Louis, Missouri). He is a student of the deceased American and Canadian psychiatrists Gerald Klerman and Theodore Reich.

In 1995 he was appointed to the chair of psychiatry and psychotherapy and as the director of the Department of Psychiatry and Psychotherapy at the University of Bonn. In 2018 he was given emeritus status. Ever since he has been the medical director for Research and Education at the Gezeitenhaus Clinic in Bonn. In addition, he works as a visiting consultant at the German Neuroscience Center since 2020.

He used to be a spokesman for the competence networks "Dementia" (since 2005) and "Degenerative Dementia" (since 2007), both promoted by the German Federal Ministry for Education and Research.

In 2004, 2013 and 2014 he was President of the DGPPN Congresses. Also, in 2000 Maier founded the World Psychiatric Association (WPA)’s section "Genetics in Psychiatry" and the European Psychiatric Association (EPA)’s section "Prevention of Mental Disorders".

Since 2010 he has been a leading editor of the authoritative German medical journal "Der Nervenarzt" (The Neurologist). Moreover, Maier is a co-editor of the "European Archives of Psychiatry and Clinical Neuroscience".

Wolfgang Maier is a member of the National Academy of Sciences Leopoldina (neuroscience section). He is also a member of the Berlin-Brandenburg Academy of Sciences and Humanities (BBAW) (biomedical class) and a corresponding member of the Heidelberg Academy of Sciences and Humanities.

Focus of work 
Since 1985 Wolfgang Maier has been one of the initiators of genetic research on mental disorders using modern biometric and molecular methods. On the one hand, his work focuses on the study of genetic causes, manifestations and conditions for responding to the therapy of affective and schizophrenic disorders. On the other hand, he researches the risk factors, early symptoms and development of dementia and develops treatment guidelines for dementia. Since 2010 he has been a spokesman for the steering committee developing the S3 treatment guidelines "Dementia" (posted at the AWMF). He was a member (2007/08) of the Application Committee in Bonn for the founding of the German Center for Neurodegenerative Diseases (DZNE). His work now focuses on the prevention, diagnosis and treatment of severe mental and neuropsychiatric disorders.

Other activities  
In 2002 he founded the Fliedner Klinik, Berlin, together with Klaus Hildemann.

Awards 
 Hans-Jörg-Weitbrecht Prize for Clinical Neurosciences (1991)
 Kurt-Schneider Science Award (1996)
 Forensic Psychiatry (DGPPNE) h. c. (2018)

Publications 
 Prevention of mental Disorders (together with J. Klosterkötter), 2017. Schattauer / Thieme Medical Publishers
 Understanding Alzheimer's and Dementia. The Guidebook of the Competence Network Dementia: Diagnosis, Treatment, Everyday Life, Care (together with J. Schulz and S. Weggen), 2009, Trias Publishing House
 Author/Co-author of more than 1000 medical scientific publications in international journals.

References 

German psychiatrists
Physicians from Munich
Physicians from Mainz
1949 births
German psychotherapists
Living people
Ludwig Maximilian University of Munich alumni